Kennedy Branch is a stream in St. Francois County in the U.S. state of Missouri. It is a tributary of Wolf Creek.

Kennedy Branch has the name of the local Kennedy family.

See also
List of rivers of Missouri

References

Rivers of St. Francois County, Missouri
Rivers of Missouri